Baron Lancaster is a barony title in the peerage of England created twice in 1299:
The first time for the (later) 3rd Earl of Lancaster. It is a title that might have been created, as the name given in the writ of summons might mean this. No matter if this barony was indeed created or not, the 4th baron became king as Henry IV in 1399 and the title merged with the crown.
The second time for John de Lancastre (d. 1334), on whose death the title became extinct.

Barons Lancaster (1299)
 Henry, 1st Baron Lancaster (c.1281-1345) (grandson of Henry III)
- the following did not actually carry the title, but would have had the right to do so if the title had truly been created and not by fault -
 Henry, 2nd Baron Lancaster (son) (c.1310-1361) (abeyant in 1361)
 Blanche, 3rd Baroness Lancaster (daughter) (1345-1368) (sole heiress in 1362)
 John of Gaunt, her husband, Duke of Lancaster, third of the five adult sons of Edward III (1340-1399)
 Henry, 4th Baron Lancaster (son) (1367-1413) (merged in crown in 1399)

Baron Lancaster/Lancastre (1299)
 John de Lancastre, 1st Baron Lancastre (d. 1334)

References
 

1299 establishments in England
Baronies in the Peerage of England
Extinct baronies in the Peerage of England
Noble titles created in 1299